Naage Landscape Conservation Area is a nature park is located in Harju County, Estonia.

The area of the nature park is 5 ha.

The protected area was founded in 2005 to protect Baltic Klint, its klint forests and theirs biodiversity.

References

Nature reserves in Estonia
Geography of Harju County